The Ministry of Health is the central government ministry of Sri Lanka responsible for health. The ministry is responsible for formulating and implementing national policy on health, nutrition, indigenous medicine and other subjects which come under its purview.

Provincial councils are constitutionally responsible for operating the majority of the Sri Lanka's public hospitals but some, known as line ministry hospitals, come under the direct control of the central government in Colombo. As of 2016 there were 47 line ministry hospitals (including all of the country's teaching hospitals), accounting for 47% (36,000) of all public hospital beds in the country.

The current Minister of Health is Keheliya Rambukwella. The Permanent Secretary is Major General Dr Sanjeewa Munasinghe

Ministers
The Minister of Health, Nutrition and Indigenous Medicine is a member of the Cabinet of Sri Lanka.

Secretaries

References

External links
 health.gov.lk

1931 establishments in Ceylon
Health, Nutrition and Indigenous Medicine
Health in Sri Lanka
 
Sri Lanka
Health, Nutrition and Indigenous Medicine
Members of the Board of Ministers of Ceylon
Indigenous health